Uju Ugoka Ogbodo (born 24 May 1993) is a Nigerian basketball player for the La Roche Vendée Basket Club and the Nigerian national team. She played college basketball for the Virginia Tech Hokies women's basketball team.

College career
Ugoka moved to the United States after being scouted at the Hope for girls basketball camp organised by Mobolaji Akiode. She played her freshman year at Grayson County College prior to when the basketball program of the University got disbanded in 2011, she was named into first-team NJCAA All-America honors. She moved to the Gulf Coast State College Commodores in her sophomore year, she averaged 16.69 points, 8.79 rebounds and 0.93 assists. She earned the conference player of the year honors and first-team NJCAA All-America honors She transferred to Virginia Tech Hokies women's basketball in 2012 for her Junior and Senior year, In her Junior year, she averaged 12.5 points and 8.5 rebounds. In her Senior year, she averaged 18.4 points, 9.6 rebounds and 1.2 assists per game.

Professional career
Ugoka started her professional career with the Italian Serie A side Pallacanestro Vigarano in 2014–15 season, she averaged 18.2 points, 11.4 rebounds and 1.7 assists per game. She played for the Nigerian side First Bank basketball Club in 2015, she also moved to the Italian side Basket Parma in the 2015, where she averaged 16 points, 14.1 rebounds and 1.8 assists per game. She moved to the Polish side AZS-UMCS Lublin in 2016–17 season, she averaged 12.6 points, 9.9 rebounds and 1.4 assists per game. In the 2017–18 season at Poland, she averaged 15.6 points, 10.8 rebounds and 1 assist per game. She moved to the Ligue Féminine de Basketball side La Roche Vendée Basket Club in June 2018, In the 2018–19 season, she averaged 12.6 points, 6.6 rebounds and 0.9 assist per game.

National team career

Junior team
Ugoka represented Nigeria at the 2008 FIBA Africa Under-18 Championship for Women where she averaged 3 points and 3 rebounds.

Senior team
Ugoka represented Nigeria in the qualifying round to the 2009 FIBA Africa Championship for Women, where she averaged 7 points, 3.2 rebounds and 0.5 assist per game. In the 2009 FIBA Africa Championship for Women, she averaged 7.4 points, 5.1 rebounds and 0.3 assist per game. Ugoka represented the Nigerian national team at the 2016 FIBA World Olympic Qualifying Tournament for Women in France, she averaged 5 points, 5 rebounds and 1 assist per game at the tournament.

References

1993 births
Living people
Nigerian expatriate basketball people in France
Nigerian expatriate basketball people in Italy
Nigerian expatriate basketball people in Poland
Nigerian expatriate basketball people in the United States
Nigerian women's basketball players
Sportspeople from Lagos
Virginia Tech Hokies women's basketball players